USS Bath (AK-4) was a cargo ship acquired by the U.S. Navy for service in World War I.

Acquiring a captured German freighter 

The first ship to be named Bath by the Navy, AK-4 was launched in 1913 by Oderwerke Stettiner, Stettin, Germany, as the Dutch freighter SS Andromeda; seized by Customs Officials at New Orleans, Louisiana, 6 April 1917; transferred to the Navy in May, renamed Bath 6 June 1917; and commissioned 30 July 1917.

World War I North Atlantic operations 

She left New Orleans 2 August 1917, joined a convoy at Boston, Massachusetts, and arrived at Brest, France, 18 September 1917. She was placed in Special Service with Train, Atlantic Fleet, and carried cargo between England and France until February 1918 when she returned to the United States. Bath was assigned to the Naval Overseas Transportation Service in March 1918 and carried cargo between the United States and Europe. Between February 1919 and July 1921 she carried cargo between the east and west coasts of the United States and to the Caribbean.

Post-World War I activity 

On 14 July 1921 Bath was assigned to the Asiatic Fleet and arrived at Cavite, Philippine Islands 6 January 1922.

Decommissioning 

She remained with the Asiatic Fleet until decommissioned at Cavite 9 May 1922. She was sold on 2 January 1926. She was wrecked in 1955.

Military awards and honors 
Her crew members were eligible for the following medal:
 World War I Victory Medal (with Transport clasp)

References

External links 
 NavSource Online: Service Ship Photo Archive - ID-1997 / AK-4 Bath

Ships built in Stettin
1913 ships
Cargo ships of the United States Navy
World War I cargo ships of the United States